The Taseyeva is a river in Krasnoyarsk Krai, Russia. The river is formed by the confluence of the Biryusa and Chuna and flows northwest to its mouth in the Angara, close to Kulakovo.

The Taseyeva and its tributaries, the Biryusa and Chuna rivers, drain much of the area between the Angara and the upper Yenisey. The Biryusa (west) and Chuna (east) flow crookedly north, then bear northwest and join to form the Taseyeva.

References

Rivers of Krasnoyarsk Krai